7XS is a radio station based in Queenstown, Tasmania, Australia, broadcasting on the FM radio band on a frequency of 92.1 MHz Queenstown, 105.1 MHz Strahan and 107.1 Rosebery on the west-coast of Tasmania.

It was opened on 29 May 1937 as with the callsign 7QT.

It was changed to 7XS on 1 October 1986

In November 2021, 7XS, along with other stations owned by Grant Broadcasters, were acquired by the Australian Radio Network. This deal allows Grant's stations, including 7XS, to access ARN's iHeartRadio platform in regional areas. The deal was finalized on January 4, 2022.

See also
 List of radio station callsigns in Tasmania

References

External links 
 

Radio stations in Tasmania
Radio stations established in 1937
Adult contemporary radio stations in Australia
Australian Radio Network